ZNS or ZnS may refer to:

 Zinc sulfide or zinc sulphide (ZnS), a chemical compound
 ZNS-TV, a national radio and TV broadcaster operated by the state-owned Broadcasting Corporation of The Bahamas
 ZNS-1, the oldest broadcast station in the Bahamas